1TAF may refer to:

Australian First Tactical Air Force
Desert Air Force, also known as the First Tactical Air Force